Dame Patricia Lee Reddy  (born 17 May 1954) is a New Zealand lawyer and businesswoman who served as the 21st governor-general of New Zealand from 2016 to 2021.

Before becoming governor-general, Reddy was a partner of a law firm, headed a major review of intelligence agencies, held multiple directorships, chaired the New Zealand Film Commission and worked as a chief negotiator on Treaty of Waitangi settlements. Prime Minister John Key advised the Queen to appoint Reddy to succeed Sir Jerry Mateparae as the Queen's representative, and Reddy was sworn in for a five-year term on 28 September 2016.

Early life and education
Born in Matamata, New Zealand, on 17 May 1954, Reddy is the daughter of Neil William and Catherine Marjorie "Kay" Reddy, both of whom were schoolteachers. Three of her forebears left Ireland and went to Canada, Australia, and New Zealand. A distant cousin, singer Helen Reddy, was descended from the Australian forebear. Reddy was raised in the small Waikato towns of Te Akau and Minginui until her family moved to Hamilton when she was six years old. There, she attended Hillcrest Primary School, Peachgrove Intermediate School and Hamilton Girls' High School.

Reddy completed tertiary study at Victoria University of Wellington, graduating with a Bachelor of Laws in 1976 and a Master of Laws with first-class honours in 1979.

Career
Reddy was a junior lecturer and then lecturer at Victoria University's Faculty of Law. In 1982 she joined the Wellington firm Watts and Patterson (now Minter Ellison Rudd Watts), becoming their first female partner in 1983. She specialised in tax, corporate and film law. She later took up a position at Brierley Investments, where she was employed for 11 years, and worked on large acquisition negotiations such as the privatisation of Air New Zealand.

Reddy served as chair of the New Zealand Film Commission and Education Payroll Ltd and was a director of Payments NZ Ltd and Active Equity Holdings Ltd. She was a chief Crown negotiator for Treaty of Waitangi settlements and a lead reviewer for the Performance Improvement Framework for the State Services Commission. She was also the deputy chair of the New Zealand Transport Agency. Other directorships included Telecom Corporation of New Zealand Ltd, SKYCITY Entertainment Group, New Zealand Post and Air New Zealand.

In 2016, Reddy and Sir Michael Cullen collaborated on an independent report to the New Zealand government reviewing legislation covering the country's intelligence agencies. Their report was released on 9 March 2016, two weeks before Reddy's appointment as governor-general was publicly announced. The report recommended expanding the Government Communications Security Bureau's rights to monitor the personal communications of New Zealanders, and was met with some controversy.

Reddy was also involved in a number of non-governmental organisations, particularly in the arts and gender equality. She was one of the founding members in 2009 of Global Women New Zealand, a group of prominent women who advocate for inclusion and diversity in leadership.

In December 2022, she was elected chair of New Zealand Rugby.

Governor-General of New Zealand

In March 2016, it was announced that Queen Elizabeth II had approved the appointment of Reddy as the next governor-general of New Zealand, for a five-year term starting in September 2016, on the advice of then Prime Minister John Key. She was officially sworn in as the 21st governor-general by Chief Justice Dame Sian Elias on 28 September. The swearing-in ceremony included a Māori pōwhiri, a 21-gun salute, and music from the Royal New Zealand Air Force Band and the New Zealand Opera Chorus; the ceremony was attended by hundreds of observers, including film-makers Sir Peter Jackson and James Cameron (a former neighbour), with an address by Prime Minister John Key. Reddy became the third woman to hold the position, after Dame Catherine Tizard and Dame Silvia Cartwright.

Reddy gave her first Royal assent as governor-general on 18 October 2016.

On 7 November 2016, Reddy welcomed King Willem-Alexander and Queen Máxima of the Netherlands to New Zealand. She hosted a state banquet.

On 12 December 2016, subsequent to the resignation of John Key, Reddy swore in Bill English as prime minister and Paula Bennett as deputy prime minister.

On 7 February 2017, Reddy delivered her first annual Waitangi Day Bledisloe Address at the Bledisloe Garden reception at Government House, Wellington.

In her first overseas trip, Reddy visited Niue and the Cook Islands, the associated states of New Zealand, on 21 and 22 March 2017 respectively. Reddy was welcomed by Tom Marsters, the Queen's Representative in the Cook Islands.

On 6 May 2017, Reddy travelled to Italy, where she visited various cultural events in Rome and Venice. On 14 May, she visited Barbados, where she met with the Governor-General of Barbados, Elliott Belgrave, and the prime minister, Freundel Stuart.

On 30 September 2017, Reddy travelled to Israel for a two-day trip, in which she represented New Zealand at official commemorations to mark the centennial of the Battle of Beersheba during the First World War. She was received by Israeli President Reuven Rivlin and later met with Prime Minister Benjamin Netenyahu.

On 26 October 2017, Reddy presided at the swearing-in of the new Executive Council. She signed warrants appointing the new prime minister, Jacinda Ardern, and other ministers. On 8 November, Reddy attended the State Opening of Parliament where she addressed MPs from the throne.

On 24 October 2017, Reddy hosted a state welcome for the president of Ireland, Michael D. Higgins, at Government House. A couple of weeks later, Reddy hosted German President Frank-Walter Steinmeier at Government House from 5 to 7 November 2017. The visit started with a wreath-laying ceremony at Pukeahu National War Memorial Park.

On 5 December 2017, Reddy began a three-day trip to Malaysia. The state visit marked the sixtieth year of diplomatic relations between New Zealand and Malaysia. Among several engagements, Reddy had an audience with Sultan Muhammad V, and attended a state banquet.

On 1 January 2018, Reddy issued her New Year video message. She focused on gender equality and respect for women; Reddy also noted the 125th anniversary of women's suffrage in New Zealand.

Reddy welcomed former US President Barack Obama to Government House on 22 March 2018. On 23 April, Reddy travelled to Turkey to represent New Zealand at commemorative events associated with the Gallipoli campaign; on 26 April, she met Turkish President Recep Tayyip Erdoğan at the Presidential Palace in Ankara.

On 28 October 2018, Reddy welcomed members of the Royal Family, Prince Harry, Duke of Sussex, and Meghan, Duchess of Sussex, to Wellington. She also hosted a reception at Government House honouring the 125th anniversary of women's suffrage. The following month, on 19 November, Reddy hosted the President of Chile Sebastián Piñera. On 3 December she welcomed the President of the Republic of Korea, Moon Jae-in and his wife Kim Jung-sook to New Zealand during a ceremony at Auckland Government House.

On 15 March 2019, Reddy released a message expressing condolences to the victims of the Christchurch mosque shootings. She remarked "Now more than ever is the time to affirm the values that we hold dear – compassion, kindness and tolerance.".

On 7 June 2019, Reddy represented New Zealand at the commemorations for the 75th anniversary of the D-Day landings at Portsmouth in the United Kingdom.

In October 2019 she visited Japan on an official visit.

Reddy's last overseas visit was to Australia in June 2021. She completed her term as Governor-General of New Zealand on 28 September 2021.

Personal life
 
Reddy is married to the former New Zealand Judicial Conduct Commissioner, Sir David Gascoigne. They married one week before her appointment as governor-general was announced. She and her first husband, Geoff Harley, a tax barrister, divorced in 1988. Both husbands were her associates at Rudd Watts & Stone in Wellington in the 1980s.

Reddy is the first vegan governor-general. Accordingly, the banquet at her swearing-in ceremony was entirely vegan.

Honours and awards

In the 2014 Queen's Birthday Honours, Reddy was appointed a Dame Companion of the New Zealand Order of Merit for services to the arts and business. In June 2016, she was made a Dame of the Most Venerable Order of the Hospital of Saint John of Jerusalem.

Reddy was promoted as an Additional Dame Grand Companion of the New Zealand Order of Merit and appointed an Additional Companion of the Queen's Service Order on 27 June 2016 in preparation for becoming governor-general. As governor-general, Reddy is entitled to be styled "Her Excellency" while in office and "The Right Honourable" for life.

Victoria University of Wellington conferred an honorary Doctor of Laws degree on Reddy on 13 December 2017.

Reddy was appointed Commander of the Royal Victorian Order in the 2022 New Year Honours. The president of Hungary awarded Reddy the Commander's Cross of the Hungarian Order of Merit in 2022.

Arms

See also
 List of female representatives of heads of state

References

External links

 Biography of The Rt Hon Dame Patsy Reddy GNZM, QSO

1954 births
Companions of the Queen's Service Order
Dames Grand Companion of the New Zealand Order of Merit
Dames of the Order of St John
Governors-General of New Zealand
Living people
20th-century New Zealand lawyers
New Zealand people of Irish descent
People educated at Hamilton Girls' High School
People from Matamata
Victoria University of Wellington alumni
Academic staff of the Victoria University of Wellington
New Zealand Commanders of the Royal Victorian Order
21st-century New Zealand lawyers
Commander's Crosses of the Order of Merit of the Republic of Hungary (civil)
Female governors-general